Georges Marie René Picot (24 December 1838 – 16 August 1909) was a French lawyer and historian.

His main work is Histoire des États généraux for which he twice gained the prize of the French Academy in 1873 and 1874.

Biography
Georges Picot was born in Paris, son of Charles Picot (Orléans, 4 August 1795 – Paris, 31 January 1870) and his wife Henriette Bidois (Paris, 1799 – Paris, 19 November 1862). He married in Saint-Bouize on 19 June 1865 with Marie Adélaïde Marthe Bachasson de Montalivet (Paris, 9 October 1844 – Paris, 2 August 1914), daughter of Marthe Camille Bachasson, Count of Montalivet and a great-granddaughter of King Louis XV of France by one of his mistresses, Catherine Eléonore Bernard (1740–1769).

He had seven children, the third of whom was the diplomat François Georges-Picot, and the fifth, Geneviève Picot, was the maternal grandmother of Valéry Giscard d'Estaing. Through his son Charles, he was a grandfather of Jacques Georges-Picot, chairman of Suez Canal Company.

He died in Allevard-les-Bains.

Works 
 Histoire des États généraux: considérés au point de vue de leur influence sur le gouvernement de la France de 1355 à 1614. – Paris, 1872 (4 vols.) – online: Band 1, Tom. 2, Tom. 3, Tom. 4 (2me édition, revue et augmentée en cinq volumes. Paris: Hachette, 1888)
 Socialisme et devoir social. – Paris : A. Picard, 1890
 L’Usage de la liberté. – Paris, 1893
 La Lutte contre le socialisme révolutionnaire. – Paris: A. Colin, 1895 Document électronique
 Notice historique sur la vie et les travaux de Jules Simon: lue dans la séance publique annuelle de l’Académie des sciences morales et politiques du 5 décembre 1896. – Paris: Firmin Didot, 1896 Document électronique
 Barthélemy Saint-Hilaire : notice historique. – Paris: Hachette, 1899 Document électronique
 Gladstone. – Paris, 1904

References

1838 births
1909 deaths
Writers from Paris
Lawyers from Paris
19th-century French historians
French male non-fiction writers
Members of the Académie des sciences morales et politiques
Corresponding Fellows of the British Academy